Butterfly House, also known as 23 Amber Road, was the only residence in Singapore with curved wings. The building's curved wings were demolished in 2008 as they took up too much space.

Description
The Butterfly House was two-storeys tall, built in front of the sea and featured a unique semi-circular verandah which was designed to catch the sea breeze. However, due to land reclamation, by 2006, the building was no longer in front of the sea. The building featured a porch above the driveway of the building which protruded beyond the legal limit.

History
The Butterfly House was built in 1912 by Alexander William Cashin and was designed by prominent architect Regent Alfred John Bidwell. Cashin then gave the building to his brother-in-law, D. Kitovitz. 

A proposal to conserve the building was first made in 2005. However, as the building's wings took up almost all of the land within the gates of the house, the conservation building would cause a complete loss of development potential to the owner. In 2006, developers AG Capital lodged an option to buy and develop the site. The Urban Redevelopment Authority gave AG Capital permission for total redevelopment. In response, more than 30 letters were sent to the government in protest of the redevelopment of the site. Several news articles were also written in protest of the demolition of the building. 

In 2007, it was announced that the wings of the building would be demolished and replaced by an 18-storey condominium, which would be completed in 2009. The complex would be connected to the remaining parts of the building, which included the entrance porch and the stairwell of the building. The condominium complex was named The Aristo @ Amber.

References

Buildings and structures in Singapore
1912 establishments in Singapore
2008 disestablishments in Singapore